This is a list of films produced by the Tollywood (Telugu language film industry) based in Hyderabad in the year 1980.

1980
Telugu
Telugu films